Eric Fields (born June 14, 1982) is an American professional boxer. He is from Ardmore, Oklahoma.

Amateur career
Fields started boxing in 2003 and became the 2005 and 2006 National Golden Gloves Heavyweight champion. In 2005 he beat Tony Grano, the U.S. Amateur Heavyweight Champion.

Professional career
Fields turned pro in 2006 and won his first six fights, five by knockout, before knocking out Mexican 2004 Olympian Ramiro Reducindo on July 27, 2007, in Corona, California in the first round.

On January 18, 2008, Fields defeated former IBF cruiserweight champion Kelvin Davis by technical knockout at 55 seconds of the first round. In June 2007, Davis had broken his back in two places while training in Australia and was winless in his last eight bouts of a futile comeback attempt, getting knocked out four times after the broken back including the Fields bout. Fields dropped Davis with the first right hand he threw. Davis was subsequently knocked out in the first round again by Alexander Frenkel.

Fields suffered his first career loss against Ola Afolabi on April 12, 2008, in a bout for the vacant WBO NABO cruiserweight title, the only pro bout in which Fields went past the sixth round. Fields got tired in the 8th round, Afolabi knocking him down twice in the round. Fields managed to survive the round. In the 10th round, Fields was knocked down again, and got up, but was getting hit. The referee had to stop the fight by technical knockout at 55 seconds of the tenth round. Afolabi had not fought in two and a half years prior to the Fields bout.

Fields fought Jeff Yeoman in Oklahoma City on February 11, 2010, and won the fight by technical knockout in the 3rd round.

Professional boxing record

External links
 
Article

1982 births
Living people
People from Ardmore, Oklahoma
Boxers from Oklahoma
Cruiserweight boxers
National Golden Gloves champions
American male boxers